Golden Valley is a village in the Mashonaland West province in Zimbabwe.

Populated places in Mashonaland West Province